Gan Siqi (May 1903 – February 1964), born as Jiang Fengwei, other name Jiang Bingkun, was a general of the People's Liberation Army of China.

Gan was born in Ningxiang, Hunan Province. He joined the Communist Youth League in 1925, and joined the Communist Party of China in 1926. He went to the Soviet Union in 1927 to study at Moscow Sun Yat-sen University. He came back in 1930, and became political director in Red Six Army Group and Red Two Army Group. He participated in the Long March.

During the Second Sino-Japanese War, he was the director of political department of 120 division of Eighth Route Army.

During the Chinese Civil War, he was the director of political department in No. 1 Field Army.

After formation of the People's Republic of China, he was the vice political commissar and director of political department of Chinese People's Volunteer Army. Later he became vice director of the General Political Department of PLA.

He was made a general in 1955.

He was a delegate to the 1st National People's Congress, a deputy of 7th CPC National Congress, and an alternate member of 8th CPC Central Committee.

His wife, Li Zhen, was the first female major general in PRC.

1903 births
1964 deaths
People's Liberation Army generals from Hunan
People from Ningxiang
Chinese Communist Party politicians from Hunan
People's Republic of China politicians from Hunan
Politicians from Changsha